Youssouf Fofana (born 10 January 1999) is a French professional footballer who plays as a midfielder for Ligue 1 club Monaco and the France national team.

Early life
Youssouf Fofana was born on 10 January 1999 in Paris. He is of Malian descent.

Club career
Fofana began his career with various youth academies in Paris, before joining the youth academy of Strasbourg on 21 February 2017. He made his professional debut with Strasbourg in a 2–0 Ligue 1 loss to Lyon on 24 August 2018.

Fofana played his final game for Strasbourg on 25 January 2020, a 3–1 away win over Monaco. Four days later, he was signed by Monaco for €15 million, and made his debut on 1 February, playing 71 minutes of a 3–1 away defeat to Nîmes. On 25 November 2021, Fofana scored his first goal for Monaco, the winning goal in a 2–1 UEFA Europa League victory at home over Real Sociedad. He scored his first league goal with the club in a 4–2 home defeat to Troyes on 31 August 2022.

International career
Fofana was a youth international for France from under-19 to under-21 level.

On 15 September 2022, Fofana received his first call-up to the France national team for two UEFA Nations League matches against Austria and Denmark. In November, he was called up for the 2022 FIFA World Cup in Qatar by Didier Deschamps. At the tournament, he played in six of France's seven matches, starting the ones against Tunisia in the group stage (1–0 loss) and Morocco in the semi-finals (2–0 win). In the final against Argentina on 18 December, Fofana came on as a 96th-minute substitute in extra time for Adrien Rabiot. The game ended with a score of 3–3, and Argentina came out victorious on penalties.

Career statistics

Club

International

Honours
Strasbourg
Coupe de la Ligue: 2018–19

France
FIFA World Cup runner-up: 2022

References

External links

France profile at FFF
Profile at the AS Monaco FC website

1999 births
Living people
Footballers from Paris
French footballers
Association football midfielders
Red Star F.C. players
JA Drancy players
RC Strasbourg Alsace players
AS Monaco FC players
Championnat National 3 players
Ligue 1 players
France youth international footballers
France under-21 international footballers
France international footballers
2022 FIFA World Cup players
Black French sportspeople
French sportspeople of Malian descent